Bauschinger may refer to:

 Bauschinger (surname)
 Bauschinger effect, named after Johann Bauschinger
 2306 Bauschinger (1939 PM), a main-belt asteroid discovered in 1939, named after Julius Bauschinger